The canton of Le Mée-sur-Seine is a French former administrative division, located in the Seine-et-Marne département, in Île-de-France région. It was disbanded following the French canton reorganisation which came into effect in March 2015. It consisted of 5 communes, which joined the canton of Savigny-le-Temple in 2015.

Demographics

Composition 
The canton of Le Mée-sur-Seine was composed of 5 communes:
Boissettes
Boissise-la-Bertrand
Cesson
Le Mée-sur-Seine
Vert-Saint-Denis

Election results

See also
Cantons of the Seine-et-Marne department
Communes of the Seine-et-Marne department

References

Mee sur seine, Le
2015 disestablishments in France
States and territories disestablished in 2015